'Pseudomonas' boreopolis is a species of Gram-negative bacteria. Following 16S rRNA phylogenetic analysis, it was determined that  'P.' boreopolis belonged in the Xanthomonas—Xylella rRNA lineage. It has not yet been further classified.

References

External links
Type strain of Pseudomonas boreopolis at BacDive -  the Bacterial Diversity Metadatabase

Xanthomonadales